Sunol is an unincorporated area and census-designated place in Alameda County, California. Located in the Sunol Valley of the East Bay, the population was 913 at the 2010 census. It is best known as the location of the Sunol Water Temple and for its historic tourist railroad system, the Niles Canyon Railway.

Etymology

Sunol, formerly Sunolglen, is named for Don Antonio Suñol. His adobe ranch house from the 1840s was located where the San Francisco water system's works are now located.

History
The first Sunol post office opened in 1871 and the name was changed to Sunolglen the same year. The name reverted to Sunol in 1920. The town's name is in honor of Antonio Suñol, first postmaster in nearby San Jose and part owner of the historical Rancho Valle de San Jose land grant that once contained the site of the town.

Geography
Sunol is located adjacent to two railroads and lies near the crossroads of Interstate 680 and State Route 84. These connect Sunol with Fremont to the south and west, Pleasanton to the north, and Livermore to the northeast.

The town lies near Alameda Creek at the northwest edge of the Sunol Valley.

North of the town is Kilkare Woods, accessible only through Sunol.

Demographics

2010 Census data
The 2010 United States Census reported that Sunol had a population of 913. The racial makeup of Sunol was 780 (85.4%) White, 1 (0.1%) African American, 6 (0.7%) Native American, 48 (5.3%) Asian, 7 (0.8%) Pacific Islander, 19 (2.1%) from other races, and 52 (5.7%) from two or more races. Hispanic or Latino of any race were 91 persons (10.0%).

The Census reported that 100% of the population lived in households.

There were 362 households, out of which 76 (21.0%) had children under the age of 18 living in them, 228 (63.0%) were opposite-sex married couples living together, 20 (5.5%) had a female householder with no husband present, 9 (2.5%) had a male householder with no wife present.  There were 16 (4.4%) unmarried opposite-sex partnerships, and 5 (1.4%) same-sex married couples or partnerships. 81 households (22.4%) were made up of individuals, and 24 (6.6%) had someone living alone who was 65 years of age or older. The average household size was 2.52.  There were 257 families (71.0% of all households); the average family size was 2.90.

The population was spread out, with 148 people (16.2%) under the age of 18, 74 people (8.1%) aged 18 to 24, 164 people (18.0%) aged 25 to 44, 377 people (41.3%) aged 45 to 64, and 150 people (16.4%) who were 65 years of age or older.  The median age was 49.3 years. For every 100 females, there were 101.1 males.  For every 100 females age 18 and over, there were 100.8 males.

There were 394 housing units at an average density of 14.2 per square mile (5.5/km), of which 362 were occupied, of which 272 (75.1%) were owner-occupied, and 90 (24.9%) were occupied by renters. The homeowner vacancy rate was 1.1%; the rental vacancy rate was 4.1%.  708 people (77.5% of the population) lived in owner-occupied housing units and 205 people (22.5%) lived in rental housing units.

2000 Census data
As of the census of 2000, there were 1,332 people, 483 households, and 368 families residing in the CDP. There were 503 housing units at an average density of 15.3 per square mile (5.9/km). The racial makeup of the CDP was 84.46% White, 0.98% Native American, 4.80% Asian, 0.23% Pacific Islander, 4.13% from other races, and 5.41% from two or more races.  8.71% of the population were Hispanic or Latino of any race.

There were 483 households, out of which 32.3% had children under the age of 18 living with them, 66.3% were married couples living together, 5.4% had a female householder with no husband present, and 23.8% were non-families. 17.2% of all households were made up of individuals, and 4.8% had someone living alone who was 65 years of age or older.  The average household size was 2.76 and the average family size was 3.12.

In the CDP, the population was 22.7% under the age of 18, 8.2% from 18 to 24, 25.5% from 25 to 44, 33.0% from 45 to 64, and 10.7% who were 65 years of age or older.  The median age was 41 years. For every 100 females, there were 106.2 males.  For every 100 females age 18 and over, there were 104.4 males. The median income for a household in the CDP was $88,353, and the median income for a family was $96,121. Males had a median income of $77,666 versus $37,102 for females. The per capita income for the CDP was $45,773.  None of the families and 1.4% of the population were living below the poverty line, including no under eighteens and none of those over 64.

Area attractions

The Sunol Water Temple is an unusual Roman-inspired structure that marks the confluence of three sources of water that flow into the Sunol Valley.
Elliston Vineyards.  Offers wine tasting on the weekends, and is a popular wedding destination. 
Nella Terra Cellars. A vineyard and wedding destination with wine tastings, open once a month or by appointment.
The Niles Canyon Railway Sunol Depot was built in 1884, and is the last surviving example of a Southern Pacific standard design known as a "One-Story Combination Depot #7."  The building has been restored and is operated by the Pacific Locomotive Association.
Niles Canyon Road runs westward from Sunol and is a scenic  drive to Fremont.
 A statue of Bosco, the dog elected mayor, sits in front of the Post Office. Bosco achieved a degree of international notoriety in 1990 when the Chinese newspaper People's Daily reported on his tenure as an alleged example of the failings of the American electoral process.
In 2007, songwriter Will Stratton released a song named after the town on his first album.
 Sunol Regional Wilderness

School district
The majority of Sunol is in the Sunol Glen Unified School District. Castro Valley Unified School District and Pleasanton Unified School District have small portions of Sunol.

The Sunol Glen School, a K–8 public school, is the sole school of Sunol Glen USD. High school students are served by Foothill High School in nearby Pleasanton.

References

External links

Census-designated places in Alameda County, California
Populated places established in 1871
1871 establishments in California
Census-designated places in California